Ivan Oleksandrovych Tyshchenko (born 7 July 1998) is a Ukrainian professional footballer who plays as an attacking midfielder for Ukrainian First League club LNZ Cherkasy.

References

External links
 
 

1998 births
Living people
Sportspeople from Cherkasy
Piddubny Olympic College alumni
Ukrainian footballers
Association football midfielders
FC Zorya-Akademia Bilozirya players
FC Vorskla Poltava players
FC Oleksandriya players
FC Cherkashchyna players
FC VPK-Ahro Shevchenkivka players
FC LNZ Cherkasy players
Ukrainian First League players
Ukrainian Second League players